Olearia subspicata, commonly known as spiked daisy bush or shrubby daisy-bush, is a species of flowering plant in the family Asteraceae and is endemic to continental Australia. It is an erect shrub with more or less linear leaves and white and yellow, daisy-like inflorescences.

Description
Olearia subspicata is an erect shrub that typically grows to a height of and has woody stems. The edges of the leaves are rolled under, the upper surface is more or less glabrous and the lower surface, when visible, is woolly-hairy.

Taxonomy
This daisy was first formally described in 1845 by William Jackson Hooker who gave it the name Eurybia subspicata in Thomas Mitchell's Journal of an Expedition into the Interior of Tropical Australia. In 1867 George Bentham changed the name to Olearia subspicata in Flora Australiensis. The specific epithet (subspicata) means "almost spicate".

Distribution and habitat
Spiked daisy bush grows in shrubland, mallee and mulga and is widely distributed in Western Australia, South Australia, the southern parts of the Northern Territory, western New South Wales, Queensland and the far north-west of Victoria.

References

Taxa named by William Jackson Hooker
Plants described in 1845
Flora of Western Australia
Flora of South Australia
Flora of the Northern Territory
Flora of Queensland
Flora of New South Wales
Flora of Victoria (Australia)
subspicata